Dammyano Grootfaam (born 13 May 1991) is a Dutch former professional footballer who played as a right winger for Eredivisie club NEC Nijmegen and Eerste Divisie club FC Oss during the 2011–12 season.

References

Living people
1991 births
Sportspeople from Oss
Association football forwards
Dutch footballers
NEC Nijmegen players
TOP Oss players
Eredivisie players
Eerste Divisie players
Footballers from North Brabant
21st-century Dutch people